The 2016 FC Tobol season is the 18th successive season that the club playing in the Kazakhstan Premier League, the highest tier of association football in Kazakhstan. Tobol finished the season 7th, top of the Relegation group, whilst the wear knocked out of the Kazakhstan Cup by Kyzylzhar at the last 16 stage.

Season events
Following a surprise defeat to Kyzylzhar in the Kazakhstan Cup, manager Dmitriy Ogai left the club by mutual consent. On 30 April, Oleg Lotov was appointed as interim manager, before Omari Tetradze was appointed as the club's full-time manager on 30 May 2016.

Squad

Out on loan

Reserve team

Transfers

Winter

In:

Out:

Summer

In:

Out:

Friendlies

Competitions

Kazakhstan Premier League

Regular season

Results summary

Results by round

Results

League table

Relegation round

Results summary

Results by round

Results

League table

Kazakhstan Cup

Squad statistics

Appearances and goals

|-
|colspan="14"|Players away from Tobol on loan:
|-
|colspan="14"|Players who appeared for Tobol that left during the season:

|}

Goal scorers

Disciplinary record

References

External links
Official VK
Official Website

FC Tobol seasons
Tobol